Funtime or Fun Time may refer to:
 "Funtime" (Iggy Pop song), 1977, covered by Boy George
 "Funtime" (The Spitfire Boys song), 1979
 Funtime Comics, a Christchurch, New Zealand based collective of comic artists and writers
 Fun Time (TV series), a Canadian children's television series
 Fun Time (album), a 1975 album by Count Basie
 "Fun Time", a song written by Allen Toussaint and performed by Joe Cocker on the 1978 album Luxury You Can Afford
 Funtime, Inc., a former amusement park operator based in Cleveland, Ohio
 Funtime (manufacturer), an Austrian amusement ride manufacturer
Funtime (amusement park), an amusement park in Surfers Paradise, Queensland, Australia